The men's singles WH2 tournament of the 2019 BWF Para-Badminton World Championships took place from 20 to 25 August.

Seeds 

 Kim Jung-jun (world champion)
 Chan Ho Yuen (final)
 Martin Rooke (quarter-finals)
 Kim Kyung-hoon (quarter-finals)
 Amir Levi (quarter-finals)
 Julio César Godoy (first round)
 Sanjeev Kumar (group stage)
 Rick Cornell Hellmann (first round)

Group stage 
All times are local (UTC+2).

Group A

Group B

Group C

Group D

Group E

Group F

Group G

Group H

Knock-out stage

References 

2019 BWF Para-Badminton World Championships